Lewis Smith (born 16 March 2000) is a Scottish professional footballer who plays for Hamilton Academical, as a midfielder.

Club career
Smith attended St Ninian's High School, Giffnock and was involved with the youth system at Hamilton Academical, the club his family supported, from the age of 9.

After signing a professional contract in summer 2016, he appeared for the club's age-restricted teams in three editions of the Scottish Challenge Cup and in the 2018–19 UEFA Youth League, before making his debut for the Accies senior team on 31 October 2018, appearing from the bench for the last ten minutes of a 3–0 away defeat to Aberdeen in the 2018–19 Scottish Premiership.

Smith made his first league start for the club on 10 August 2019 against Kilmarnock at New Douglas Park; he scored the opening goal and created the second in a 2–0 victory, receiving praise for his performance.

In November 2019 he signed a new contract with Hamilton, until summer 2022. He signed a further extension, until summer 2024, in November 2021.

International career
Smith has represented Scotland at under-17 youth level; he sat four of his Higher school exams while on international duty at the 2017 UEFA European Under-17 Championship in Croatia. In August 2019 he was called-up by the under-21 squad, making his debut in September 2019.

References

2000 births
Living people
Scottish footballers
Hamilton Academical F.C. players
Scottish Professional Football League players
Association football midfielders
Scotland youth international footballers
Scotland under-21 international footballers
People educated at St Ninian's High School, Giffnock